The 1936 Cordele–Greensboro tornado outbreak was a tornado outbreak that affected the Southeastern United States during April 1936. The Greensboro, North Carolina, and Cordele, Georgia, tornadoes were the deadliest spawned during the April 1–2 outbreak, which developed in three waves of tornadic activity over 14 hours, associated with the same storm system.

On the evening of April 2, 1936, the Greensboro tornado left a long path of F4 damage across the south side of Greensboro, passing through the south side of downtown. The storm began its path near High Point Road at Elam Street and continued east along Lee Street to east of Bennett College. This storm left $2 million in damage in Greensboro (1936 USD). It was responsible for 14 deaths and 144 injuries, standing as the second-deadliest tornado in the history of North Carolina after a February 1884 tornado that caused 23 deaths along a path from Rockingham to Lillington.

Later in the week, a second outbreak would spawn devastating tornadoes in Waynesboro, Tennessee, Tupelo, Mississippi, and Gainesville, Georgia.

Tornado table

April 1

April 2

See also 
 1936 Tupelo–Gainesville tornado outbreak – An even deadlier outbreak that occurred just days after this one
 List of North American tornadoes and tornado outbreaks
 List of tornadoes striking downtown areas

References

Bibliography 
 
 

F4 tornadoes by date
Cordele-Greensboro,1936-04-01
Tornadoes of 1936
Tornadoes in Alabama
Tornadoes in Georgia (U.S. state)
Tornadoes in South Carolina
Tornadoes in North Carolina
Concord, North Carolina
Cordele-Greensboro Tornado Outbreak
History of Greensboro, North Carolina
1936 natural disasters in the United States
Cordele–Greensboro tornado outbreak